David Thomas McIlroy (born 2 March 1968) is a British diplomat who was British Ambassador to Guinea from 2019 to 2022.

Diplomatic career 
McIlroy joined the Foreign Office in 2000. His appointment as Ambassador to Guinea was made in 2019 by Foreign Secretary Jeremy Hunt.

In 2022, McIlroy was posted to the Foreign, Commonwealth and Development Office.

References 

1968 births
Living people
21st-century British diplomats
Ambassadors of the United Kingdom to Guinea